Thornton is a suburb in the City of Maitland, New South Wales, Australia. It is bisected by the New England Highway.

Post code 2322, including Thornton, Beresfield, Tarro and Hexham, had a population of 14,654 in 2001.

History 
The traditional owners and custodians of the Maitland area are the Wonnarua people.

The suburb takes its name from Thornton railway station. The station was originally known as Woodford, but the name was changed to Thornton in 1887 and relocated to a new site in 1913.

Transport 
Thornton railway station opened in 1871. Thornton is serviced by Hunter Line trains of the NSW TrainLink network. Regular services take passengers East to Newcastle (18 minutes for the express) and West to Maitland. Less regular services also take passengers West to the Hunter Valley as far as Scone and North to Dungog.

Thornton is the junction for a colliery branch line leading to the Bloomfield Coal Loop, a balloon loop.

A new industrial estate and increased residential subdivisions resulted in the RTA planning a major upgrade to the Weakleys Drive intersection, which was completed as of December 2008. DBT (Australia) opened their new complex here in December 2006.

Education 
Thornton has a government primary school of Thornton Primary. It is also the home of Aspect Hunter School which offers schooling options for students with autism K-12 in the Hunter Region.

References 

Suburbs of Maitland, New South Wales